Allan McLean (1855 – January 31, 1881) was a Canadian outlaw, born in Thompson's River Post, New Caledonia (now Kamloops, British Columbia).

Media

References

 
 
 
 

1855 births
1881 deaths
People from Kamloops
Pre-Confederation British Columbia people
Executed Canadian people
Canadian outlaws
Canadian people convicted of murdering police officers
People executed for murdering police officers
Persons of National Historic Significance (Canada)
People executed by Canada by hanging
People executed for murder
19th-century Canadian criminals